Dunnottar or Dunottar may refer to:

Dunnottar Castle, Scotland
Dunnottar Parish Church, Stonehaven, Scotland
Dunnottar, Manitoba, Canada
Dunottar School, Surrey, England

See also
RMS Dunottar Castle, steam ship of the Union Castle Line
MS Dunnottar Castle, passenger ship later renamed Victoria